Ravindra Amonkar  is a Goan theatre artist and director and also a previous vice-chairman  of Bal Bhavan Goa.

Early life
Amonkar founded production houses like Navrang Stars and Vakratund and children’s stage movement (Baalnatya Chalval ) in Goa.

Career
Amonkar has worked with Sangeet Natak, andpromoted children’s theatre in Goa as Vice Chairperson of Bal Bhavan. From school level to Higher Secondary level he's organised workshops, competitions, and taught acting in telefilms specially meant for children.

Goa's traditional arts
Shri. Ravindra Amonkar is associated with the festive traditional theatre in Goa, and has contributed by directing youngsters and the professional actors. He has also taken the traditional stage to the National level and held positions on the executive and general body committee of Kala Academy, Akhil Bharatiya Marathi Natya Parishad, Akhil Govmantak Marathi Natya Maha Sangh, Goa College of Music, West Zone Culture (Udaipur), Sahitya Sevak Mandal, Saraswati Mandir, Directorate of Art & Culture, Government of Goa.

Government

 Served as a member of Executive in Kala Academy — Goa.
 Served as a member of the General board in Kala Academy — Goa.
 Served as Chairman of State Cultural Awards selection Committee of Department of Arts and Culture — Government of Goa.
 Esteemed member of judgement team for State level competition in Goa & also judged competitions in Maharashtra State and Delhi.
 Served as a resource person on almost all the forums related to theatre in Goa.
 Presently serving as Vice Chairman of Bal Bhavan — Goa.

See also
Akhil Bharatiya Marathi Natya Parishad
Cinema of India
Konkani cinema
Kala Academy
Marathi theatre

References

Living people
1950 births
Male actors in Marathi theatre
Male actors in Konkani cinema
Male actors from Goa